The 2011 Mexican Figure Skating Championships took place between 10 and 15 November 2010 in Cuautitlán Izcalli. Skaters competed in the disciplines of men's singles, ladies' singles, and ice dancing on the senior level. The results were used to choose the Mexican teams to the 2011 World Championships and the 2011 Four Continents Championships.

Senior results

Men

Ladies

Ice dancing

External links
 results

2011 in figure skating
2010 in figure skating
Figure Skating Championships
Figure Skating Championships
2011